Keming may refer to:

 Keming Primary School, in Singapore

People
 Keming, courtesy name of Du Ruhui (585–630), Tang Dynasty chancellor
 Liu Keming, other name of Liu Zhixun (1898–1932), member of the Chinese Workers' and Peasants' Red Army
 Cao Keming (1934–2014), People's Republic of China politician in Jiangsu
 Hu Keming (born 1940), Chinese table tennis player
 Bai Keming (born 1943), People's Republic of China politician, member of the National People's Congress

See also
 Kerning